An academic, or scientific genealogy organizes a family tree of scientists and scholars according to mentoring relationships, often in the form of dissertation supervision relationships, and not according to genetic relationships as in conventional genealogy. Since the term academic genealogy has now developed this specific meaning, its additional use to describe a more academic approach to conventional genealogy would be ambiguous, so the description scholarly genealogy is now generally used in the latter context.

Overview
The academic lineage or academic ancestry of someone is a chain of professors who have served as academic mentors or thesis advisors of each other, ending with the person in question. Many genealogical terms are often recast in terms of academic lineages, so one may speak of academic descendants, children,  siblings, etc. One method of developing an academic genealogy is to organize individuals by prioritizing their degree of relationship to a mentor/advisor as follows: (1). doctoral students, (2). post-doctoral researchers, (3). master's students and (4). current students, including undergraduate researchers.

Through the 19th century, particularly for graduates in sciences such as chemistry, it was common to have completed a degree in medicine or pharmacy before continuing with post-graduate or post-doctoral studies. Until the early 20th century, attaining professorial status or mentoring graduate students did not necessarily require a doctorate or graduate degree. For instance, the University of Cambridge did not require a formal doctoral thesis until 1919, and academic genealogies that include earlier Cambridge students tend to substitute an equivalent mentor. Academic genealogies are particularly easy to research in the case of Spain's doctoral degrees, because until 1954 only Complutense University had the power to grant doctorates. This means that all holders of a doctorates in Spain can trace back their academic lineage to a doctoral supervisor who was a member of Complutense's Faculty.

Websites such as the Mathematics Genealogy Project or the Chemical Genealogy document academic lineages for specific subject areas, while some other sites, such as Neurotree and Academic Family Tree aim to provide a complete academic genealogy across all fields of academia.

Influence
Academic genealogy may influence research results in areas of active research.  Hirshman et al. examined a controversial medical question, the value of maximal surgery for high grade glioma, and demonstrated that a physician's medical academic genealogy can affect his or her findings and approaches to treatment.

References

External links

The Academic Family Tree: A project combining academic genealogies of 38 (as of August 2015) academic disciplines
Neurotree: The neuroscience family tree
Linguistree: The linguistics family tree
Mathematics genealogy search (includes much of computer science and physics) 
 The Astronomy Genealogy Project
Chemical genealogy
Scientific genealogy master list (two sections: Scientists Associated with Concepts in Chemistry & Physics; Scientists Associated with Discovering the Elements)
How to trace your scientific genealogy
Philosophy Family Tree
Automatic doctoral advisor genealogy diagram using Wikipedia by Nghia Ho

 
Genealogy
Genealogy
History of science